Jolanta Fraszyńska (born 14 December 1968 in Mysłowice) – Polish actress in film and theater.

Biography 
Fraszyńska spent her childhood in Mysłowice, Poland. As a six year old she began performing in the singing and dancing program of the local cultural center WSS "Społem", and later in the church-affiliated arts organization Oaza. She matriculated at the State Higher Theater School in Wrocław (wrocławska Państwowa Wyższa Szkoła Teatralna) upon completing her studies at the pre-school academy Studium Wychowania Przedszkolnego. In 1990 she completed further schooling in Kraków at the Państwowa Szkoła Teatralna im. Ludwika Solskiego. During 1991–1998 she worked as actress in the theater Teatr Polski in Wrocław. In 1998 she moved to Warsaw at the leading Teatr Dramatyczny. She took part in twenty-five productions of the television-broadcast Teatr Telewizji.

She debuted in cinematic work in 1991, playing Ania in In flagranti, a film by Wojciech Biedroń.

From 6 September 2008 she had participated in the 4th edition of the television program Jak oni śpiewają, but 28 September 2008 she was forced to cancel owing to health problems, ultimately taking 13th place in the overall competition. In 2011 she joined the jury panel of the 13th edition of Polish Dancing with the Stars (Taniec z gwiazdami), thereby replacing actress Beata Tyszkiewicz.

Private life 
Fraszyńska has two daughters: Nastazja (born 1990), from her first marriage with fellow actor Robert Gonera and Aniela (born 12 May 2004), with her second husband Grzegorz Kuczeriszka, a film cameraman, whom she divorced in the spring of 2010.

For two years she was an ambassador for a social charity campaign Ogólnopolska Kampania Społeczna Forum Against Depression.

Jolanta Fraszyńska decided to participate in a Playboy Polska pictorial, featured in the May 1999 issue.
She has also authored one of the fables in the anthology Bajki gwiazd (2005), available in print and as a recording.

Filmography

Film roles 
 1986: Budniokowie i inni
 1989: Szklany dom – ciężarna córka mieszkanki kamienicy
 1989: Powroty
 1991: In flagranti – Ania, studentka doktora Nowaka
 1992: Białe małżeństwo – Bianka
 1992: Żegnaj Rockefeller – Julia Kuczmańska, dziewczyna Michała
 1992: Enak – dziewczyna z komitetu wyborczego
 1993: Wow (installments 12 and 13)
 1993: Pora na czarownice – Jola Markowska
 1993: Łowca. Ostatnie starcie – psycholog Tereska, przyjaciółka Parviny
 1993: Goodbye Rockefeller – Julia Kuczmańska, dziewczyna Michała
 1995: Prowokator – urzędniczka na poczcie
 1996: Maszyna zmian. Nowe przygody – Ewa (installment 1)
 1997: Królowa złodziei – Francoise
 1997: Wojenna narzeczona – Ania, kelnerka w restauracji Dąbrowskiego (odc. 3 i 4)
 1997: Boża podszewka – Elżutka Jurewicz, siostra Marysi
 1998: Ekstradycja 3 – haker Ćma
 1998: Sto minut wakacji – Danuta Milley
 1999: Sto minut wakacji – Danuta Milley
 1999: Kiler-ów 2-óch – Aldona Lipska
 1999–2010: Na dobre i na złe – Monika Zybert-Jędras
 1999: Ja, Malinowski – Eliza
 2000: Dom – Jola, córka Ekstra-mocnego (odc. 24 i 25)
 2001: Zostać miss – Katarzyna Wolska, reporterka radia „Stolica”
 2001: Domek dla Julii – Julia
 2001: Pieniądze to nie wszystko – Małgosia, sekretarka Turkota
 2001: Cisza – przyjaciółka Mimi
 2001: Kocham Klarę – aktorka Jola Kapuścińska (odc. 13)
 2003: Zróbmy sobie wnuka – sprzedawczyni
 2004: Ławeczka – Kasia
 2005: Skazany na bluesa – Małgorzata „Gola” Riedel, żona Ryśka
 2005: Pitbull – żona tirowca (odc. 4)
 2005: Anioł Stróż – Beata, siostra Anny
 2008: Niania – Sandra (odc. 109)
 2008: Hotel pod żyrafą i nosorożcem – Anna Miłobędzka
 2010–2011: Licencja na wychowanie – Roma Barańska
 2012: Hotel 52 – Grażyna Jabłońska (odc. 54)
 2012: Ja to mam szczęście – Wanda (odc. 34)
 2012: Sęp – sędzia
 2015: M jak miłość – Zuzanna Marszałek
 2015: Ojciec Mateusz – laborantka Agnieszka Murawska (odc. 171)

Polish-language dubbing roles 
 2009: Esterhazy – Matka polskiej rodziny
 2007: Pana Magorium cudowne emporium – Molly Mahoney
 2005: Czerwony Kapturek – prawdziwa historia – Czerwony Kapturek
 2000: Droga do El Dorado – Chel
 1998: Rudolf czerwononosy Renifer – Fiołek
 1998: Mulan – Fa Mulan
 1995: Grający z talerza – Janka
 2013: Ralph Demolka – Vandelopa von Cuks

Selected theater roles 
 1991: Nasze miasto, thesis performance – Emilka
 1991: Ania z Zielonego wzgórza by Lucy Maud Montgomery – Ania
 1992: Pułapka by Tadeusz Różewicz
 1992: Płatonow by Anton Czechov – Sasza
 1993: Płatonow – akt pominięty by Anton Czechov – Sasza
 1994: Romeo i Julia – Julia
 1997: Hedda Gabler by Henrik Ibsen – Pani Elvsted
 1998: Niezidentyfikowane szczątki ludzkie by Brad Fraser – Jerri
 1999: Opera żebracza by Václav Havel – Jeny
 1999: Hamlet – Guildenstern
 1999: Powrót Odysa by Stanisław Wyspiański
 2001: Wymazywanie by Thomas Bernhard
 2008: Ucho Van Gogha Fred Apka – She
 2010: Fredro dla dorosłych mężów i żon by Aleksander Fredro

Television theater 
 1992: Obcy bliscy by Gundmundur Steinsson – Marta
 1992: Roberto Zucco – Little girl
 1993: Gyubal Wahazar – Świntusia Macabrescu
 1999: Dybuk – Gitel
 2006: Umarli ze Spoon River – Dora Williams

References

External links 
 
 Bio in film.onet.pl
 Interview in Gala, issue 36/2009
 Jolanta Fraszyńska in the Polish Film Academy database

Living people
1968 births
Actors from Wrocław
People from Mysłowice
Polish film actresses
Polish television actresses
Polish stage actresses
Polish voice actresses